The Onbekendegracht (Unknown Canal) is a short canal in Amsterdam, in the eastern part of the Grachtengordel (canal belt).

Location

The Onbekendegracht, which connects the Nieuwe Prinsengracht and the Nieuwe Achtergracht, is located directly behind the Royal Theater Carré in the Weesperbuurt.
The cast iron bridge no. 252, built in 1899, connects Nieuwe Achtergracht with the Onbekendegracht. 
This pedestrian bridge is one of the 72 municipal monuments in the form of a bridge. 
The buildings at Onbekendegracht 1–5, built in 1906 and designed by AJ Tymensen, became a monument in 2006. 
Also bridge no. 253 is over the Onbekendegracht.

Name

The Onbekendegracht originally gave the Voormalige Stadstimmertuin street access to the Amstel. 
In a notarial deed drawn up in 1800 the canal was called "the Onbekende or Amstelgragtje". 
The name Korte Amstelgrachtje was also in vogue.
In 1948, residents of the Onbekendegracht asked the municipality of Amsterdam to change the name of the canal because they found it too strange. 
However, the request was not granted.

Mill 

The impressionist Claude Monet painted a canvas in 1871 entitled "Le Moulin de l'Onbekende Gracht, Amsterdam" on which the "Rooseboom" mill is depicted. 
This 17th-century mill stood between the Amstel and the Onbekendegracht. 
In the course of time the mill was also called "Binnen Tuchthuismolen", "Het Land van Beloften" or "de Eendracht". 
In Monet's time, woods such as Paubrasilia were ground by the mill for the production of dyes. 
The mill was demolished in 1876 to make room for construction of the Carré theater.

Monet's painting can be seen in the Museum of Fine Arts, Houston.

See also 
Canals of Amsterdam

Notes

Sources

Canals in Amsterdam